The suffix '-otomy' is derived from the Greek suffix τόμος, -tómos, "meaning cutting, sharp, or separate".

Medical procedures
 Amniotomy — An incision created to accelerate labor.
 Androtomy — Dissection of the human body .
 Bilateral cingulotomy — Psychosurgery, treatment for depression and addiction .
 Bronchotomy — A procedure that ensures there is an open airway between a patients lung/s and the outside world.
 Clitoridotomy — Plastic surgery of the clitorial hood.
 Coeliotomy — A large incision through the abdominal wall to gain access into the abdominal cavity
 Colpotomy —  Extraction of fluid from the pouch of Douglas (a rectouterine pouch[1] posterior to the vagina) through a needle
 Cordotomy — Procedure that disables selected pain-conducting tracts in the spinal cord, in order to achieve loss of pain and temperature perception
 Craniotomy — A bone flap is temporarily removed from the skull to access the brain
 Cricothyrotomy — An incision made through the skin and cricothyroid membrane to establish a patent airway during certain life-threatening situations
 Escharotomy — Procedure used to treat full-thickness (third-degree) circumferential burns
 Episiotomy — Surgical incision of the perineum and the posterior vaginal wall
 Fasciotomy — Surgical procedure where the fascia is cut to relieve tension or pressure commonly to treat the resulting loss of circulation to an area of tissue or muscle
 Heller myotomy — Muscles of the cardia (lower oesophageal sphincter or LOS) are cut, allowing food and liquids to pass to the stomach
 Hymenotomy — Surgical removal or opening of the hymen
 Hysterotomy —  Incision in the uterus, and is performed during a Caesarean section
 Laminotomy — The partial removal (or by making a larger opening) of the lamina.
 Laparotomy — Large incision through the abdominal wall to gain access into the abdominal cavity
 Lithotomy position — Medical term referring to a common position for surgical procedures and medical examinations involving the pelvis and lower abdomen
 Lobotomy — Cutting or scraping away most of the connections to and from the prefrontal cortex, the anterior part of the frontal lobes of the brain.
 Meatotomy — Form of penile modification in which the underside of the glans is split
 Myotomy — Procedure in which muscle is cut.
 Osteotomy — A bone is cut to shorten or lengthen it or to change its alignment
 Phlebotomy — An incision in a vein with a needle
 Pulpotomy — Removal of a portion of the pulp, including the diseased aspect
 Radial keratotomy — a refractive surgical procedure to correct myopia
 Sphincterotomy — Treating mucosal fissures from the anal canal/sphincter
 Thoracotomy — Incision into the pleural space of the chest
 Thyrotomy — Incision of the larynx through the thyroid cartilage
 Tracheotomy — An incision on the anterior aspect of the neck and opening a direct airway through an incision in the trachea (windpipe)
 Trans-orbital lobotomy — Cutting or scraping away most of the connections to and from the prefrontal cortex, the anterior part of the frontal lobes of the brain

Other -otomies
 Dichotomy
 False dichotomy
 Ousterhout's dichotomy
 Trichotomy
 Trichotomy property

See also 
 List of surgical procedures
 List of -ectomies
 List of -otomies
 List of -ostomies

References

Science-related lists
Surgical procedures and techniques